Political Secretary is a constitutional office in Malaysia. As a member of the Federal Government, a Political Secretary is appointed by the Prime Minister either on his own choice or on the advice of a Minister.

Duties and responsibilities 
There has been no clear description of duties and responsibilities of a Political Secretary. In general, however, a Political Secretary is tasked to assist political duties of a Minister and provide the latter with appropriate advice on political situations in such constituency, such state or Malaysia at large. Chief Political Secretary to the Chief Minister of Sarawak, Abdullah Saidol explained that a Political Secretary is expected to heed, support and inform to the people, development policies and programmes planned by the Government.

Political secretaries to the Anwar Ibrahim cabinet 
, the following individuals have been appointed as political secretaries to the Anwar Ibrahim cabinet. They have served since December 2022. Presently, there have been 36 political secretaries serving the Prime Minister, Deputy Prime Ministers and Ministers.

Political secretaries to the Ismail Sabri cabinet 
The following individuals were appointed as political secretaries to the Ismail Sabri cabinet. They served from September or November 2021 to the dissolution of the cabinet in November 2022. There were 32 political secretaries serving the Prime Minister, Senior Ministers and Ministers.

State level 
State governments have appointed Political Secretaries as well. Appointment of state political secretaries, however, determined by the state through enactments and decisions of state executive council or cabinet. Roles and responsibilities of a state political secretary is similar to those of a federal political secretary.

Peninsular Malaysia 
In states of Peninsular Malaysia, a Political Secretary is appointed by the head of respective State Government and serves political affairs of the latter only.

Sabah 
In Sabah, each Minister is provided with a Political Secretary appointed by the Chief Minister on the advice of such Minister. Only Chief Minister can appoint up to four Political Secretaries for himself.

Sarawak 
Chief Minister Abang Johari Openg has 32 political secretaries all over Sarawak.

References 

Government of Malaysia